Mohd Hashim Mustapha (31 January 1966 – 29 November 2022) was a Malaysian professional footballer who played as a striker.

Career
Hashim was born in Kota Bharu, Kelantan. In the period from the 1980s until 2000, he played for several Malaysian clubs such as Kelantan, Kedah, Johor, Kelantan JKR FC and Kelantan TNB FC as a striker. 

Hashim is Malaysia Premier League golden boot winner in 1994 season with 29 goals in 30 matches.

With Malaysia, Hashim made his international debut against Burma during the 1987 Southeast Asian Games. In the same competition, he scored his only international goal in a 2–0 semi final win over Thailand. He also participated in the 1994 Asian Games.

After he retired from playing professional football, Hashim ventured into coaching. He was the coach of D'ar Wanderers in 2018 FAM League.

Honours
Kedah FA
 Malaysia FA Cup: 1996

Johor FA
 Premier 2 League: 1999

Malaysia
 Southeast Asian Games runner-up: 1987

Individual
 Malaysian League Golden Boot: 1993 (13 goals), 1994 (25 goals)

References

External links
 Mohd Hashim Mustapha

1966 births
2022 deaths
Malaysian footballers
Malaysia international footballers
Kelantan FA players
Kedah Darul Aman F.C. players
Johor Darul Ta'zim F.C. players
People from Kota Bharu
People from Kelantan
Southeast Asian Games silver medalists for Malaysia
Southeast Asian Games medalists in football
Association football forwards
Competitors at the 1987 Southeast Asian Games
Footballers at the 1994 Asian Games
Asian Games competitors for Malaysia